Andreas Albers Nielsen (born 23 March 1990) is a Danish professional footballer who plays as a forward for German club SSV Jahn Regensburg.

Club career

Skive IK
Albers was promoted to the first team squad in the summer 2009.

Vejle Boldklub
On 7 January 2011, it was confirmed that Albers had signed a two-and-a-half-year contract with Vejle Boldklub. In the 2012–13 season. Albers played 30 league games, scoring 7 goals. After a good last season with 11 goals in 32 games, he left the club.

Silkeborg IF
Silkeborg IF confirmed on 22 May 2015 that they had signed Albers on a two-year contract. After his transfer, Albers stated that he had rejected offers from many Danish Superliga clubs, in favor of joining Silkeborg.

Albers revealed in December 2016 that he and the club had some difficulties about extending his contract. So the plan was to sell him in the January window, but however, he stayed in the club. Albers was not happy with his stay at Silkeborg because he sat to many minutes on the bench. He went out to medias in May 2017 and said, that it was his last season in Silkeborg and he would leave the club in the summer window.

Viborg FF
On 21 June 2017, Albers signed with Danish 1st Division club Viborg FF.

Jahn Regensburg
On 1 July 2019, Albers joined SSV Jahn Regensburg on a free transfer. He made his debut for the club on 28 July, coming off the bench for Sebastian Stolze in the 83rd minute and immediately proved himself decisive with an assist to Tom Baack in injury time to seal a 3–1 league victory against VfL Bochum. In the following league game, Albers scored his first goal for Jahn Regensburg, securing a 1–1 draw against Hannover 96.

References

External links
 

1990 births
Living people
Danish men's footballers
People from Skive Municipality
Association football forwards
Skive IK players
Vejle Boldklub Kolding players
Vejle Boldklub players
Silkeborg IF players
Viborg FF players
SSV Jahn Regensburg players
Danish 1st Division players
Danish Superliga players
2. Bundesliga players
Danish expatriate men's footballers
Expatriate footballers in Germany
Danish expatriate sportspeople in Germany
Sportspeople from the Central Denmark Region